Valentín Vada (born 6 March 1996) is an Argentine professional footballer who plays as a midfielder for Spanish club Real Zaragoza.

Career
Vada’s move to France was controversial. In 2010 at the age of 14 as a minor, his arrival from a non-EU country was against the laws governing the movement of underage players. Italian heritage ameliorated those concerns eventually, but Vada was unable to play in any competitive matches, even for the “B” team until he turned 17.

Vada made his Ligue 1 debut on 13 December 2015 against Angers SCO replacing Nicolas Maurice-Belay after 79 minutes. He scored his first professional goals on 8 April 2017, netting a brace in a 3–0 home defeat of FC Metz.

On 31 January 2019, the last day of the 2018–19 winter transfer window, Vada joined Bordeaux's league rivals AS Saint-Étienne on loan until the end of the season. On 23 August, he agreed to a five-year contract with Segunda División side UD Almería.

On 4 October 2020, despite being a regular starter for the Andalusians, Vada was loaned to fellow second division side CD Tenerife for the 2020–21 season. On 31 August 2021, he terminated his contract with Almería, and signed a two-year deal with Real Zaragoza in the same category just hours later.

Career statistics

Notes

References

External links

1996 births
Living people
Association football midfielders
Argentine footballers
Argentine people of Italian descent
Ligue 1 players
Championnat National 2 players
FC Girondins de Bordeaux players
AS Saint-Étienne players
Segunda División players
UD Almería players
CD Tenerife players
Real Zaragoza players
Argentine expatriate footballers
Argentine expatriate sportspeople in France
Argentine expatriate sportspeople in Spain
Expatriate footballers in France
Expatriate footballers in Spain
Footballers from Santa Fe, Argentina